Jason Anthony Jarrett (born October 14, 1975) is an American race car spotter for 23XI Racing, JR Motorsports, and On Point Motorsports. A former driver in the NASCAR Busch Series and ARCA Racing Series, he has not driven in competition since 2005. Jarrett is the son of 1999 NASCAR Winston Cup Series champion Dale Jarrett and the grandson of two-time champion Ned Jarrett.

Career

Early years
Jarrett's racing career was launched in the World Karting Association (WKA), where in 1993 he claimed the WKA's Sprint Division Championship of the Carolina's Cup at North Carolina Speedway located in Rockingham, North Carolina.

1994 saw Jarrett return to a track that had provided early success for both his father and grandfather at Hickory Motor Speedway. While competing in the Limited Sportsman Division, he scored one victory and one pole, along with earning Rookie-of-the-Year honors. In 1995, Jarrett moved into the Winston Racing Series Late Model Stock Division, where he spent the next three seasons honing his skills at the famed oval.

The 1997 season proved extremely busy for Jarrett, as he competed in a total of 46 late model events between Hickory Motor Speedway and Tri-County Speedway located in Hudson, North Carolina.

ARCA Racing Series
In 2001, Jarrett began his ARCA RE/MAX Series career, with second-place finish in the final ARCA RE/MAX Series point standingsand Rookie-of-the-Year honors. In 2002 he was 3rd in points, and in 2003 he was 2nd again in points as well as earning the Bill France Triple Crown Award. Jarrett won the penultimate race of the 2004 season but finished fifth in points while also competing in the Winston Cup Series. Switching to Venturini Motorsports for the 2005 season, Jarrett did not live up to expectations and was released mid-season, and promptly went on a streak of four DNF's in his first four races for new owner Wayne Hixson.

Craftsman Truck Series
1996 saw Jarrett attempt to make his NASCAR debut driving in the Craftsman Truck Series at North Wilksboro for Bob Crocker, but his lone attempt in the series resulted in a DNQ.

Busch Grand National Series
In 1997, Jarrett moved up to the Busch Grand National Series, driving three races for DAJ Racing and failing to qualify for two others. For 1998, Jarrett ran another partial schedule, piloting the No. 32 Carquest car for eleven races and failing to qualify for another. He recorded a best finish of 17th at Richmond International Raceway. Jarrett joined BACE Motorsports in 1999, attempting ten races and qualifying for eight of them. He also ran one race for Jarrett/Favre Motorsports, a collaboration between his father and National Football League star Brett Favre. However, he broke his foot at Memphis Motorsports Park in October and did not drive the rest of the season. He also suffered a concussion at Auto Club Speedway earlier in the season and had to be replaced by Johnny Benson Jr. Running full-time in 2000, Jarrett struggled, failing to qualify for eleven races and posting a best finish of 17th. He was also replaced by Hut Stricklin for a race at Pocono Raceway. Jarrett has not competed in the series since.

Winston Cup Series
After three years away from the sport competing in ARCA, Jarrett returned to NASCAR in 2003 and made his Winston Cup Series debut at the 2003 EA Sports 500 that October at Talladega, driving a third car for Robert Yates in the No. 98, alongside his father Dale and Elliott Sadler, who famously barrel rolled late in the race. He mainly stayed out of trouble and finished the race in 29th despite being 4 laps down. He made one other start in the series at Pocono in the summer of 2004 driving the No. 02 for Hermie Sadler's team, SCORE Motorsports, falling out after 40 laps due to a handling issue to a 40th-place result. His only other attempt in the series at Bristol in March driving for Morgan Shepherd resulted in a withdrawal.

Post-driving career
After the 2005 season he retired from racing. Starting in 2007, Jarrett worked for his father's company, Dale Jarrett Incorporated, as a project manager. In 2010, he joined Germain Racing as a spotter for drivers Casey Mears and Max Papis in the Sprint Cup and Nationwide Series. Three years later, he left the organization to join Stewart-Haas Racing (SHR) as the spotter for driver Ryan Newman in the Sprint Cup Series, and followed Newman in 2014 to Richard Childress Racing in the same role. Jarrett currently spots in all three NASCAR national series, for Newman in Cup, Ryan Truex in the Xfinity Series, and John Hunter Nemechek in the Camping World Truck Series.

In 2022, He will spot for 23XI Racing for Kurt Busch. Jarrett will also spot for Josh Berry at JR Motorsports in the Xfinity Series and Tate Fogelman at On Point Motorsports in the Camping World Truck Series.

Personal life
He now resides in Hickory, North Carolina, and is married to Christina. Their first child, Ford, was born November 14, 2008.

Career highlights
 1993 World Karting Association Sprint Division Champion
 1994 Hickory Motor Speedway Limited Sportsman Division Rookie of the Year
 2001 ARCA Racing Series Rookie of the Year
 2003 Bill France Triple Crown Award

Motorsports career results

NASCAR
(key) (Bold – Pole position awarded by qualifying time. Italics – Pole position earned by points standings or practice time. * – Most laps led.)

Nextel Cup Series

Busch Series

Craftsman Truck Series

ARCA Re/Max Series
(key) (Bold – Pole position awarded by qualifying time. Italics – Pole position earned by points standings or practice time. * – Most laps led.)

References

 Catch Fence.com article

External links
 
 

Living people
1975 births
People from Conover, North Carolina
Racing drivers from North Carolina
NASCAR drivers
ARCA Menards Series drivers
Jason
Robert Yates Racing drivers